Garbarnia Szczakowianka Jaworzno is a Polish football club based in Szczakowa, Jaworzno, Poland.  The club is currently playing in the IV liga

History
The club was founded on 9 July 1923 as fusion of three local clubs: Kartagina, Rewia''' and Sparta, under the name KS Szczakowianka. With the exception of the years 1948–1951, and brief few-day spell in 2007 (where it was met with widespread fan protests) the club has kept its Szczakowianka name throughout its existence, despite numerous minor name changes. They have spent the majority of their history in the 4th tier of Polish football, until the year 2000 they slowly started to make their way up the league pyramid.

In 2001/2002 season they gained promotion the 2nd division after a double play-off match against RKS Radomsko. However the game was shrouded in controversy as Branko Rašić became the centre of attention with Radomsko claiming he was ineligible to play as he was on loan from Victoria Jaworzno before the transfer window at the time. The case took several years to resolve, with numerous court proceedings, Polish FA involvement and even appeals to UEFA, Polish Olympic Committee, and debates in the Polish parliament. The case had widespread consequences, with many officials punished and removed from office as a result, and changes in law to prevent similar incidents in the future.

In season 2002/03, they played in Polish Premier League (Ekstraklasa), were relegated straight away. Whilst it looked like they were about to win promotion immediately, they were convicted of match-fixing, along with several other clubs in widespread enquiry that shook Polish football.

After the two scandals, the club was heavily hit by sanctions with lack of confidence from supporters and sponsors alike in the management which led to the club being bankrupt by 2007. The team carried on relying on its reserve team in the 4th division, whilst the first team was dissolved and the disgraced management made redundant.

Match-fixing scandal
After a play-off scandal where Szczakowianka were convicted of match-fixing in the 2003/04 season, Szczakowianka played in 2nd league starting with −10 points: Several matches were annulled as result.

Autumn 2003 round:
 Szczakowianka Jaworzno – Cracovia Kraków 2–1 (1–0)
 Szczakowianka Jaworzno – Arka Gdynia 4–0 (2–0)
 Szczakowianka Jaworzno – Błękitni Stargard 2–0 (1–0)
 Szczakowianka Jaworzno – Ruch Chorzów 1–0 (0–0)
 Szczakowianka Jaworzno – ŁKS Łódź  2–1 (2–1)
 Szczakowianka Jaworzno – Polar Wrocław 1–1 (0–1)
 Szczakowianka Jaworzno – Podbeskidzie Bielsko-Biała 5–2 (3–0)
 Piast Gliwice – Szczakowianka Jaworzno  1–2 (0–1)
 Jagiellonia Białystok – Szczakowianka Jaworzno  0–2 (0–1)
 RKS Radomsko – Szczakowianka Jaworzno  2–1 (0–0)
 KS Stasiak Opoczno – Szczakowianka Jaworzno  1–3 (1–2)
 Zagłębie Lubin – Szczakowianka Jaworzno  0–0 (0–0)
 Tłoki Gorzyce – Szczakowianka Jaworzno  3–2 (0–1)
 Aluminium Konin – Szczakowianka Jaworzno  1–3 (0–2)
 GKS Bełchatów – Szczakowianka Jaworzno  1–2 (1–1)
 KSZO Ostrowiec Świętokrzyski – Szczakowianka Jaworzno  1–1 (1–1)
 Szczakowianka Jaworzno – MKS Pogoń Szczecin 0–0 (0–0)

Spring 2004 round:
 Szczakowianka Jaworzno – Jagiellonia Białystok 4–0 (2–0)
 Szczakowianka Jaworzno – Tłoki Gorzyce  4–2 (1–0)
 Szczakowianka Jaworzno – Zagłębie Lubin  4–1 (1–1)
 Szczakowianka Jaworzno – GKS Bełchatów 1–2 (0–0)
 Szczakowianka Jaworzno – Piast Gliwice 1–1 (1–1)
 Szczakowianka Jaworzno – RKS Radomsko 2–0 (1–0)
 Polar Wrocław – Szczakowianka Jaworzno  0–2 (0–1)
 MKS Pogoń Szczecin – Szczakowianka Jaworzno  3–2 (2–0)
 Arka Gdynia – Szczakowianka Jaworzno  0–1 (0–0)
 Cracovia Kraków – Szczakowianka Jaworzno  8–1 (5–0)
 Podbeskidzie Bielsko-Biała – Szczakowianka Jaworzno  2–0 (2–0)
 ŁKS Łódź – Szczakowianka Jaworzno  0–1 (0–0)
 Ruch Chorzów – Szczakowianka Jaworzno  1–1 (0–1)
 Szczakowianka Jaworzno – KS Stasiak Opoczno 1–0 (1–0)
 Szczakowianka Jaworzno – Aluminium Konin 1–0 (0–0)

Current squad

Famous playersPlayers who have played in the top division''
Ryszard Czerwiec (28.02.1968, 174 cm/76 kg)
Maciej Iwański (07.05.1981, 171 cm/70 kg)
Akanni-Sunday Wasiu	
Andrzej Bledzewski (02.07.1977, 184 cm/77 kg)

Fans
Due to the number of large teams in close proximity, the club has a small but fanatical support. They used have a strong friendship with fans of Szombierki Bytom. The major rivals are cross-town neighbours Victoria Jaworzno, with whom they contest the Jaworzno derby. They also have rivalry with nearby Ruch Radzionków fans.

See also

 Football in Poland
 List of football teams
 Champions' Cup/League
 UEFA Cup

References

External links
 Official website
 Szczakowianka Jaworzno at the 90minut.pl website

 
Association football clubs established in 1923
1923 establishments in Poland